Dark in Here is the 20th studio album by indie folk band the Mountain Goats, released June 25, 2021 through Merge Records. The album was recorded in March 2020, just one week after Getting Into Knives (2020), at FAME Studios in Muscle Shoals, Alabama. Dark in Here was produced by Matt Ross-Spang, who also produced Getting Into Knives and engineered In League with Dragons (2019). In addition to being available on streaming and download services, the album was released physically on CD and vinyl.

The album's lead single, "Mobile", featuring organists Spooner Oldham and Will McFarlane, was released on April 20, 2021. "The Slow Parts on Death Metal Albums" was released on May 11, 2021, and the title track "Dark in Here" was released as the final single on June 3, 2021.

The album's cover art is a portion of the painting Valborgsmässoafton i Bergslagen, Grangärde i Dalarna ("Walpurgis Night in Bergslagen, Grandgärde in Dalarna") by Anshelm Schultzberg (1896).

Accolades

Track listing

Personnel
The Mountain Goats
 John Darnielle – guitars, vocals, piano
 Peter Hughes – bass
 Jon Wurster – drums, percussion
 Matt Douglas – woodwinds, piano, guitar

Additional personnel
 Spooner Oldham – Hammond B-3, Wurlitzer organ
 Will McFarlane – guitar
 Susan Marshall – vocal harmony
 Reba Russell – vocal harmony

Production
 Matt Ross-Spang – production, engineering
 Shana Gandhi – mixing
 John Lee Gifford – production assistant
 Brent Lambert – mastering (The Kitchen Mastering, Carrboro, North Carolina)

Charts

References

External links

2021 albums
Merge Records albums
The Mountain Goats albums
Albums produced by Matt Ross-Spang